Wehhui Tom Liu (1956- ) is a Canadian antiques specialist and collector, best known in particular for his collection of fine Chinese ceramics in North America. He is a former Chinese art consultant of the Art Gallery of Greater Victoria and the Museum of Vancouver, and the director of Canadian Society For Asian Arts. Dr. Liu was born in Beijing, China and moved to the U.S. in 1992. In 1995, he moved to Vancouver Canada where he started his career as a Chinese fine arts collector. He obtained his bachelor's degree from Nanjing Medical University and his master's degree from Chinese Academy of Medical Sciences & Peking Union Medical College, Tsinghua University, then worked as a surgeon at the Cancer Institute & Hospital and Chinese Academy of Medical Sciences.

External links 
 Art Gallery of Greater Victoria
 Museum of Vancouver 
 Canadian Society For Asian Arts

References 

 Chinese Canadian Artists Federation in Vancouver 03/29/2009

Living people
Chinese antiques experts
Nanjing Medical University alumni
Peking Union Medical College alumni
Tsinghua University alumni
Year of birth missing (living people)